Elections to Liverpool City Council were held on 7 May 1987. One third of the council was up for election on ordinary rotation; in addition there were extra vacancies in many wards caused by the disqualification of those Labour councillors who were surcharged and banned from office as part of a protest against rate-capping. As a result, the 33 wards elected a total of 59 councillors. Prior to the election the disqualification of a large part of the Labour group meant that there was a temporary administration headed by Trevor Jones of the Liberal/SDP Alliance. As a result of the election, the Labour Party regained overall control of the council, and Harry Rimmer became council leader.

Summary
After the election, the composition of the council was:

Election result

Ward results

Abercromby

Aigburth

Allerton

Anfield

Arundel

Breckfield

Broadgreen

Childwall

Church

Clubmoor

County

Croxteth

Dingle

Dovecot

Everton

Fazakerley

Gillmoss

Granby

Grassendale

Kensington

Melrose

Netherley

Old Swan

Picton

Pirrie

St. Mary's

Smithdown

Speke

Tuebrook

Valley

Vauxhall

Warbreck

Woolton

References

1987
1987 English local elections
1980s in Liverpool